Truth and Power is an "investigative docuseries", narrated by Maggie Gyllenhaal and executive produced by Brian Knappenberger (The Internet's Own Boy: The Story of Aaron Swartz). It premiered on Pivot on January 22, 2016. Each episode tells the stories of "ordinary people going to extraordinary lengths to reveal corporate exploitation and infringement on civil liberties resulting from government overreach." The documentaries use interviews and uncovered documents to discuss the "issues of security, surveillance and profiteering in the digital age."

Season 1 (2016)

 Episode 1: #BlackLivesMatter
 Episode 2: Government-Sponsored Spyware
 Episode 3: The Stingray
 Episode 4: Prisoners for Sale
 Episode 5: Activists or Terrorists?
 Episode 6: Shooting the Messenger
 Episode 7: Hacking the Presidency
 Episode 8: Data Vampires
 Episode 9: Camp Justice
 Episode 10: Flying Robots

References

2016 American television series debuts
2010s American documentary television series
Pivot (TV network) original programming